The Botanic Gardens and Parks Authority is a Western Australian Government authority charged with the administration of Kings Park and Bold Park.

It was announced on 28 April 2017 that the Department of Parks and Wildlife would merge with the Botanic Gardens and Parks Authority, the Zoological Parks Authority, and the Rottnest Island Authority on 1 July 2017 to form the Department of Biodiversity, Conservation and Attractions.

The earlier stages of administration of Kings Park and other gardens had been by individual autonomous boards.

The Kings Park Board had started in 1896.

Notes

External links
 Botanic Gardens and Parks Authority

Botany in Western Australia
Nature conservation in Western Australia
Statutory agencies of Western Australia
Protected area administrators of Australia